Tricolor cockade, or tricolour cockade, may refer to:
 Cockade of France, the national ornament of France
 Cockade of Italy, the national ornament of Italy